Fairborne  may refer to:

 Stafford Fairborne (Royalist), English soldier of the English Civil War
 Palmes Fairborne (1644–1680), English soldier and Governor of Tangier
 Stafford Fairborne (1666–1742), English MP
 Marissa Faireborn, a fictional character from the Transformers series